1,5-Methano[10]annulene, 1,5-methanoazulene or homoazulene is a hydrocarbon with chemical formula CH.

See also 
 Homoaromaticity
 Cyclodecapentaene
 1,6-Methano[10]annulene

References 

Aromatic hydrocarbons
Simple aromatic rings
Non-benzenoid aromatic carbocycles